Peter Bence (born 5 September 1991) is a Hungarian pianist, composer and music producer. 
He has gained considerable popularity with his piano arrangements of Despacito (Fonsi/Yankee/Ender), Michael Jackson, Queen and Sia collecting over 500 million video hits and a popular following on his YouTube channel and Facebook page. His most viewed video of all time is his lively rendition of "Despacito."

Bence holds a Master of Arts in Film Scoring and Electronic Production & Design from the Berklee College of Music (2010-2015). Between January 2012 and March 2017 he held the world record for most piano key hits in one minute (765) according to the Guinness book of records.

Life 
Peter Bence started playing the piano at an early age and finished his first original composition, at age 7, which was heavily influenced by the music of Mozart and Chopin. In 2002, at 11 he published his first solo piano album of his early compositions called Green Music. In 2008 he released his second album Nightfall.  The sheet music for his composition Piano Piece Based on Fibonacci Sequence, an audition piece performed in 2009, was requested by many pianists.
He was considered a musical prodigy by teachers and peers, and was already accepted at Franz Liszt University of Music in Debrecen, while he was still enrolled at elementary school.

In his teens, Peter started to show great interest in film music, especially the music of John Williams, which has opened up a new world for him and made him further explore himself musically.

After his training in classical piano and composition in Hungary, he continued his studies as a scholar at Berklee College of Music in the United States as a film scoring and piano major. Even though he was taking in every genre of music possible, he found his biggest influence in Michael Jackson.

In January 2012 he attained the Guinness World Record for the "most piano key hits in one minute" with 765 key hits, which he held until March 2017.

Peter began uploading videos to YouTube while at Berklee and in 2015 with his arrangement of Michael Jackson's ‘Bad’ he quickly rose to fame, collecting 10  million views over a few days. Now he has over 500+ million cumulative video views on Facebook and YouTube combined. In the past two years alone he has performed for tens of thousands throughout 40 countries, opened BBC's Proms in the Park 2017, in Hyde Park, London for 50,000 people, and was featured on the Ellen DeGeneres Show's website, BBC, Buzzfeed, 9GAG, Classic FM, iHeart Radio and Billboard. He is currently finishing his debut album, which will feature some of his best covers and solo piano compositions.

He won the 1st Prize InterArtia 2015 international competition in the category Pop Piano by the International Art Society in Volos, Greece.

Discography 
 2002: Green Music
 2008: Nightfall
 2020: The Awesome Piano

References

External links 
  
 
 This Michael Jackson Cover Is So 'Bad' at EllenTV.com
Pianist Peter Bence on Breaking Sound Barriers on Limelight
Peter Bence – The Fastest Pianist in the World d on Fiestalonia.net
“We’d Like to Stick to the Point, Which, of Course, is Playing the Piano” – Interview with Hungarian Pianist Bence Péter on Hungarytoday.hu
Peter Bence, the Usain Bolt of the keyboard on The Sydney Morning Herald

1991 births
Living people
Hungarian classical pianists
Male classical pianists
21st-century classical pianists
21st-century Hungarian male musicians
Berklee College of Music alumni